Randolph/Wells was a station on the Chicago Transit Authority's Loop. The station was located at 150 North Wells Street in downtown Chicago. Randolph/Wells opened on October 3, 1897, and closed just after midnight on July 17, 1995; the station and Madison/Wells were replaced by Washington/Wells.

A small remaining portion of the original station platform contains a shed housing automatic switching equipment for Tower 18.

References

External links 

Randolph/Wells seen in a home movie from 1990

Defunct Chicago "L" stations
Railway stations in the United States opened in 1897
Railway stations closed in 1995
1897 establishments in Illinois
1995 disestablishments in Illinois
Former North Shore Line stations